In Celebration is a 1969 play by the English writer David Storey. It is set in a Nottinghamshire mining town and tells the story of three brothers who visit their parents for their 40th wedding anniversary.

According to Storey, the three brothers are based on aspects of himself: "One was a very passive nature, the second was a kind of conformist nature, and the third was a kind of bolshie nature that didn't want to have anything to do with the other two." The play took three days to write. It premiered in April 1969 at the Royal Court Theatre, where it was directed by Lindsay Anderson and ran for twelve weeks. Anderson also directed a 1975 film adaptation with the same title.

Original cast
Andrew Shaw - Alan Bates
Mr Shaw - Bill Owen
Mrs Shaw - Constance Chapman
Colin Shaw - James Bolam
Steven Shaw - Brian Cox
Mrs Burnett - Gabrielle Daye
Reardon – Fulton Mackay

References

1969 plays
Nottinghamshire in fiction
British plays adapted into films
Plays by David Storey
Plays set in England